Camrose County is a municipal district in central Alberta, Canada. It is located in Census Division 10, around the City of Camrose.

Geography

Communities and localities 
The following urban municipalities are surrounded by Camrose County.
Cities
Camrose
Towns
Bashaw
Villages
Bawlf
Bittern Lake
Edberg
Hay Lakes
Rosalind
Summer villages
none

The following hamlets are located within Camrose County.
Hamlets
Armena
Duhamel
Ferintosh, dissolved from village status on January 1, 2020
Kelsey
Kingman
Meeting Creek
New Norway, dissolved from village status on November 1, 2012
Ohaton
Pelican Point
Round Hill
Tillicum Beach

The following localities are located within Camrose County.
Localities 

Ankerton
Barlee Junction
Battle
Braim (designated place)
Campbelton
Demay
Dinant
Dorenlee
Dried Meat Lake
Edensville
Ervick

Ferlow Junction
Grouse Meadows
Kiron
Mccree Acres
Meldal Subdivision
Miquelon Acres
Paradise Resort
Sherman Park Subdivision
Twomey
Viewpoint
Woodridge Heights

Demographics 

In the 2016 Census of Population conducted by Statistics Canada, Camrose County had a population of 8,458 living in 3,118 of its 3,492 total private dwellings, a  change from its 2011 population of 8,004.

See also 
List of communities in Alberta
List of municipal districts in Alberta

References

External links 

 
Municipal districts in Alberta